is a rakugo artist. He currently resides in Tokyo. He first performed in September, 1965 at Shinjuku Suehirotei, with a story called Karanuke. He regular performs in Shinjuku, Asakusa, Ueno and Ikebukuro. In 2005, he released a DVD from Avex titled Tachibanaya Takezou.

External links
Tachibanaya Takezou (in Japanese)

1947 births
Living people
People from Nagano Prefecture
Rakugoka